This is a list of all butterflies and skippers found in the state of Oklahoma. Butterflies and skippers are a monophyletic group found in the insect order Lepidoptera. (See the difference between a butterfly and a moth.)

Butterflies
Order: Lepidoptera
Superfamily: Papilionoidea

Swallowtails
Family: Papilionidae

Swallowtails: Papilioninae

Subfamily: Papilioninae
Pipevine swallowtail (Battus philenor)
Zebra swallowtail (Eurytides marcellus)
Black swallowtail (Papilio polyxenes)
Thoas swallowtail (Papilio thoas)
Giant swallowtail (Papilio cresphontes)
Eastern tiger swallowtail (Papilio glaucus)
Two-tailed swallowtail (Papilio multicaudata)
Spicebush swallowtail (Papilio troilus)
Palamedes swallowtail (Papilio palamedes)

Whites and sulphers

Family: Pieridae

Whites
Subfamily: Pierinae
Florida white (Appias drusilla)
Becker's white (Pontia beckerii)
Spring white (Pontia sisymbrii)
Checkered white (Pontia protodice)
Cabbage white (Pieris rapae)
Large marble (Euchloe ausonides)
Olympia marble (Euchloe olympia)
Falcate orangetip (Anthocharis midea)

Sulphurs
Subfamily: Coliadinae
Clouded sulphur (Colias philodice)
Orange sulphur (Colias eurytheme)
Southern dogface (Zerene cesonia)
White angled-sulphur (Anteos clorinde)
Cloudless sulphur (Phoebis sennae)
Orange-barred sulphur (Phoebis philea)
Large orange sulphur (Phoebis agarithe)
Lyside sulphur (Kricogonia lyside)
Barred yellow (Eurema daira)
Mexican yellow (Eurema mexicana)
Little yellow (Eurema lisa)
Sleepy orange (Eurema nicippe)
Dainty sulphur (Nathalis iole)

Gossamer-wing butterflies

Family: Lycaenidae

Harvester
Subfamily: Miletinae
Harvester (Feniseca tarquinius)

Coppers
Subfamily: Lycaeninae
American copper (Lycaena phlaeas)
Gray copper (Lycaena dione)
Bronze copper (Lycaena hyllus)
Purplish copper (Lycaena helloides)

Hairstreaks
Subfamily: Theclinae
Great purple hairstreak (Atlides halesus)
Soapberry hairstreak (Phaeostrymon alcestis)
Coral hairstreak (Satyrium titus)
Behr's hairstreak (Satyrium behrii)
Edwards' hairstreak (Satyrium edwardsii)
Banded hairstreak (Satyrium calanus)
Striped hairstreak (Satyrium liparops)
Southern hairstreak (Fixsenia favonius)
Frosted elfin (Callophrys irus)
Henry's elfin (Callophrys henrici)
Eastern pine elfin (Callophrys niphon)
Thicket hairstreak (Callophrys spinetorum)
Juniper hairstreak (Callophrys gryneus)
White M hairstreak (Parrhasius m-album)
Gray hairstreak (Strymon melinus)
Red-banded hairstreak (Calycopis cecrops)

Blues

Subfamily: Polyommatinae
Western pygmy-blue (Brephidium exile)
Cassius blue (Leptotes cassius)
Marine blue (Leptotes marina)
Reakirt's blue (Echinargus isola)
Eastern tailed-blue (Cupido comyntas)
Spring azure (Celastrina ladon)
Summer azure (Celastrina neglecta)
Silvery blue (Glaucopsyche lygdamus)
Melissa blue (Plebejus melissa)
Lupine blue (Icaricia lupini)

Metalmarks
Family: Riodinidae
Little metalmark (Calephelis virginiensis)
Northern metalmark (Calephelis borealis)

Brush-footed butterflies

Family: Nymphalidae

Snouts
Subfamily: Libytheinae
American snout (Libytheana carinenta)

Heliconians and fritillaries
Subfamily: Heliconiinae
Gulf fritillary (Agraulis vanillae)
Zebra heliconian (Heliconius charithonia)
Variegated fritillary (Euptoieta claudia)
Diana (Speyeria diana)
Great spangled fritillary (Speyeria cybele)
Regal fritillary (Speyeria idalia)
Edwards' fritillary (Speyeria edwardsii)

True brush-foots
Subfamily: Nymphalinae
Dotted checkerspot (Poladryas minuta)
Fulvia checkerspot (Thessalia fulvia)
Bordered patch (Chlosyne lacinia)
Gorgone checkerspot (Chlosyne gorgone)
Silvery checkerspot (Chlosyne nycteis)
Texan crescent (Phyciodes texana)
Graphic crescent (Phyciodes graphica)
Phaon crescent (Phyciodes phaon)
Pearl crescent (Phyciodes tharos)
Field crescent (Phyciodes pratensis)
Painted crescent (Phyciodes picta)
Variable checkerspot (Euphydryas chalcedona)
Baltimore (Euphydryas phaeton)
Question mark (Polygonia interrogationis)
Eastern comma (Polygonia comma)
Gray comma (Polygonia progne)
Mourning cloak (Nymphalis antiopa)
American lady (Vanessa virginiensis)
Painted lady (Vanessa cardui)
West Coast lady (Vanessa annabella)
Red admiral (Vanessa atalanta)
Common buckeye (Junonia coenia)

Admirals and relatives
Subfamily: Limenitidinae
Red-spotted purple (Limenitis arthemis)
'Astyanax' red-spotted purple (Limenitis arthemis astyanax)
Viceroy (Limenitis archippus)
Weidemeyer's admiral (Limenitis weidemeyerii)
California sister (Adelpha bredowii)
Common mestra (Mestra amymone)

Leafwings
Subfamily: Charaxinae
Goatweed leafwing (Anaea andria)

Emperors
Subfamily: Apaturinae
Hackberry emperor (Asterocampa celtis)
Tawny emperor (Asterocampa clyton)

Satyrs
Subfamily: Satyrinae
Southern pearly eye (Enodia portlandia)
Northern pearly eye (Enodia anthedon)
Creole pearly eye (Enodia creola)
Canyonland satyr (Cyllopsis pertepida)
Gemmed satyr (Cyllopsis gemma)
Carolina satyr (Hermeuptychia sosybius)
Georgia satyr (Neonympha areolata)
Little wood satyr (Megisto cymela)
Red satyr (Megisto rubricata)
Common wood-nymph (Cercyonis pegala)
Ridings' satyr (Neominois ridingsii)

Monarchs
Subfamily: Danainae
Monarch (Danaus plexippus)
Queen (Danaus gilippus)

Skippers

Order: Lepidoptera
Family: Hesperiidae

Spread-wing skippers
Subfamily: Pyrginae
Silver-spotted skipper (Epargyreus clarus)
Long-tailed skipper (Urbanus proteus)
Golden banded-skipper (Autochton cellus)
Hoary edge (Achalarus lyciades)
Southern cloudywing (Thorybes bathyllus)
Northern cloudywing (Thorybes pylades)
Confusing cloudywing (Thorybes confusis)
Outis skipper (Cogia outis)
Hayhurst's scallopwing (Staphylus hayhurstii)
Dreamy duskywing (Erynnis icelus)
Sleepy duskywing (Erynnis brizo)
Juvenal's duskywing (Erynnis juvenalis)
Rocky Mountain duskywing (Erynnis telemachus)
Horace's duskywing (Erynnis horatius)
Mottled duskywing (Erynnis martialis)
Zarucco duskywing (Erynnis zarucco)
Funereal duskywing (Erynnis funeralis)
Wild indigo duskywing (Erynnis baptisiae)
Common checkered-skipper (Pyrgus communis)
Common streaky-skipper (Celotes nessus)
Common sootywing (Pholisora catullus)

Grass skippers
Subfamily: Hesperiinae
Swarthy skipper (Nastra lherminier)
Clouded skipper (Lerema accius)
Least skipper (Ancyloxypha numitor)
Orange skipperling (Copaeodes aurantiacia)
Southern skipperling (Copaeodes minima)
Fiery skipper (Hylephila phyleus)
Uncas skipper (Hesperia uncas)
Ottoe skipper (Hesperia ottoe)
Leonard's skipper (Hesperia leonardus)
Cobweb skipper (Hesperia metea)
Green skipper (Hesperia viridis)
Dotted skipper (Hesperia attalus)
Peck's skipper (Polites peckius)
Rhesus skipper (Polites rhesus)
Carus skipper (Polites carus)
Tawny-edged skipper (Polites themistocles)
Crossline skipper (Polites origenes)
Whirlabout (Polites vibex)
Southern broken-dash (Wallengrenia otho)
Northern broken-dash (Wallengrenia egeremet)
Little glassywing (Pompeius verna)
Sachem (Atalopedes campestris)
Arogos skipper (Atrytone arogos)
Delaware skipper (Anatrytone logan)
Byssus skipper (Problema byssus)
Hobomok skipper (Poanes hobomok)
Zabulon skipper (Poanes zabulon)
Broad-winged skipper (Poanes viator)
Dion skipper (Euphyes dion)
Black dash (Euphyes conspicua)
Dun skipper (Euphyes vestris)
Dusted skipper (Atrytonopsis hianna)
Viereck's skipper (Atrytonopsis vierecki)
Bronze roadside-skipper (Amblyscirtes aenus)
Linda's roadside-skipper (Amblyscirtes linda)
Oslar's roadside-skipper (Amblyscirtes oslari)
Lace-winged roadside-skipper (Amblyscirtes aesculapius)
Nysa roadside-skipper (Amblyscirtes nysa)
Dotted roadside-skipper (Amblyscirtes eos)
Common roadside-skipper (Amblyscirtes vialis)
Bell's roadside-skipper (Amblyscirtes belli)
Dusky roadside-skipper (Amblyscirtes alternata)
Eufala skipper (Lerodea eufala)
Brazilian skipper (Calpodes ethlius)
Ocola skipper (Panoquina ocola)

Giant-skippers
Subfamily: Megathyminae
Yucca giant-skipper (Megathymus yuccae)
Strecker's giant-skipper (Megathymus streckeri)

Oklahoma
Lists of fauna of Oklahoma